The men's 100 metres T38 event at the 2020 Summer Paralympics in Tokyo took place on 28 August 2021.

Records
Prior to the competition, the existing records were as follows:

Results

Heats
Heat 1 took place on 28 August 2021, at 11:10:

Heat 2 took place on 28 August 2021, at 11:16:

Final
The final took place on 28 August 2021, at 19:35:

References

Men's 100 metres T38
2021 in men's athletics